Rivarol is a French nationalist and far-right weekly magazine. The editor of the magazine, Fabrice Bourbon, was condemned for incitement to hatred against Jews due to his articles in the magazine.

On 8 April 2016, around 600 fans of the magazine, attended a banquet in a Paris hotel, to celebrate the 65-year run of the magazine. The banquet included Jean-Marie Le Pen, Pierre Vial, Henry de Lesquen, Pierre Sidos, Yvan Benedetti, Alexandre Gabriac and Robert Faurisson

Background
Established in January 1951, the magazine was started as a meeting point, for those who had collaborated with the Nazis or who had been active with the Vichy regime and had just freed from prison. Previous editor of the magazine was Marie France Wacquez.

References

External links
Official website (in French)

1951 establishments in France
Far-right politics in France
Fascist newspapers and magazines
French-language magazines
Magazines established in 1951
Magazines published in Paris
Political magazines published in France
Weekly magazines published in France
Antisemitic publications